Sultan Naga Dimaporo, officially the Municipality of Sultan Naga Dimaporo (Maranao: Inged a Sultan Naga Dimaporo;), is a 5th class municipality in the province of Lanao del Norte, Philippines. According to the 2020 census, it has a population of 60,904 people.

It is formerly known as Karomatan.

History
Executive Order No. 588, s. 1953 (Signed on April 30, 1953) created the Karomatan from the following:
(note that Lanao was split 1959)
 From Kapatagan: Tagalo, Mabohai, Pandanan, Pikinit, Dangoloan, Dabliston, Calobi, Tapokon, Karomatan, Pitikol, Sigayan
 From Malabang: Bauyan, Dadoan, Calibao Payong
The barrio/baranggay of Karomatan was then made the Poblacion of this municipality

Geography
Sultan Naga Dimaporo or Karomatan is located at the south-western part of the province of Lanao del Norte. It is bordered on the southeast by the municipality of Picong in Lanao del Sur, and on the west by the municipalities of Tukuran and Aurora, both in Zamboanga del Sur. To the south is the tip of Illana Bay, part of the Celebes Sea.

Barangays

Sultan Naga Dimaporo is politically subdivided into 37 barangays.

Climate

Demographics

Economy

References

External links
 Sultan Naga Dimaporo Profile at the DTI Cities and Municipalities Competitive Index
 [ Philippine Standard Geographic Code]
 Philippine Census Information
 Local Governance Performance Management System

Municipalities of Lanao del Norte
Establishments by Philippine executive order